Gordon Charles Rollings (17 April 1926 – 7 June 1985) was an English actor who mainly appeared on television, but also appeared on-stage and in feature films. He was born in Batley, in the West Riding of Yorkshire, England in 1926 and started his career in radio in Palestine. It was in Palestine while serving in the British Army during the Mandate that he was shot by a sniper of the Stern Gang. He later trained as a clown in Paris, appearing in the Medrano Circus.

Rollings made an uncredited screen appearance in the Beatles' film A Hard Day's Night. He played the man in the pub who is shocked to find that Ringo has thrown a dart into his lunch. Director Richard Lester later used him in both Superman films he directed: in the first, he plays a fisherman who is stunned to see General Zod walking on water and in the second, he appears as a pedestrian in a flat cap who upsets a display of toy penguins that triggers the slapstick chaos in the opening credits scene.

After a number of small parts in TV shows such as Z-Cars in the early 1960s, on 21 April 1964, he was the first presenter of BBC 2's daily programme for young children, Play School, alongside Virginia Stride. In the same year he played the character of Charlie Moffitt in Coronation Street. Between 1966 and 1967 Rollings appeared as a storyteller in ten episodes of the BBC children's television show Jackanory, reading amongst others, stories of Worzel Gummidge. (Rollings would later appear in a 1981 episode of the televised series of Worzel Gummidge). He later narrated The Herbs, and as the character Arkwright with his small dog, Tonto, in the adverts for John Smith's Bitter.

Filmography

References

External links

1926 births
1985 deaths
Deaths from cancer in England
English male film actors
English male television actors
English male voice actors
Male actors from Yorkshire
People from Batley
20th-century English male actors
BBC television presenters
English terrorism victims
British military personnel of the Palestine Emergency